The first Summer Olympic Games was held in 1896 in Athens, but women competed for the first time in next games in 1900 in Paris. An Egyptian woman was scheduled to compete for the first time in the 1972 Summer Olympics, but the Munich massacre during that Games led to the departure of Egypt's delegation before the she could compete. The Egyptian woman made her first appearance in 1984 Summer Olympics in Los Angeles, 88 years after the first tournament, to become the fourth Arab woman to take part in the Olympics after Algeria, Libya, and Syria. Since then, the Egyptian women have taken part in every Summer Olympic Games.

The number of female Egyptian Olympic participants varied from their first appearance in 1984 Summer Olympics which witnessed the participant of 6 women, which was the highest (6 Sportswoman) till 2000 Summer Olympics in Sydney (15 sportswoman)، Since then, number of participants increased on each tournament until it reached 37 women in 2016 Summer Olympics Same for sports, number of various sports that Egyptian women participated in one tournament was the maximum in first appear in 1984 Summer Olympics (4 sports) till 2000 tournament when it increased to 9, and it kept increasing till 2016 games (18 Sport).

Egypt didn't have any female Olympic medalist for 120 years. On 10 August 2016, the Egyptian weightlifter Sara Ahmed became the first Egyptian female medalist by winning the bronze medal in weightlifting 69 kg event by lifting total of 255 kg, she was also the first Arabian woman to win an Olympic medal in weightlifting.

Sportswomen

Sports

References

Lists of Olympic sportswomen
Egypt at the Summer Olympics